Leonardo Rimes da Cunha (born 12 July 1979, in Rio de Janeiro), known simply as Leonardo, is a Brazilian retired footballer who played as a right back.

References

1979 births
Living people
Footballers from Rio de Janeiro (city)
Brazilian footballers
Association football defenders
Liga Portugal 2 players
Segunda Divisão players
Ermesinde S.C. players
G.D. Ribeirão players
Leixões S.C. players
Moreirense F.C. players
AC Vila Meã players
S.C.U. Torreense players
Alki Larnaca FC players
Shensa players
Brazilian expatriate footballers
Expatriate footballers in Portugal
Expatriate footballers in Cyprus
Expatriate footballers in Iran
Brazilian expatriate sportspeople in Portugal
Brazilian expatriate sportspeople in Cyprus
Brazilian expatriate sportspeople in Iran